Terem Quartet is a musical ensemble from Saint Petersburg, Russia. The ensemble playing in the genre of Crossover was created in 1986. Since that time, Terem Quartet has released 17 CDs, and its repertoire includes more than 500 musical compositions of classical and modern music.

Terem Quartet has performed more than 2,500 concerts in more than 60 countries. The ensemble is regarded as a symbol of Saint Petersburg because it has represented its native city in many cultural events all over the world.

The recent line-up includes: Andrey Konstantinov (soprano domra), Andrey Smirnov (bayan), Vladimir Kudryavtcev (double bass) and Alexey Barshchev (alto domra)

History

1980s 

The ensemble was created in 1986 as a project of four St. Petersburg Conservatory students: Andrey Konstantinov (soprano domra), Andrey Smirnov (bayan), Mikhail Dzudze (double bass balalaika) and Igor Ponomarenko (alto domra). At one time the students were called up for military service. After the first year of this service they were transferred to the local army ensemble which consisted of orchestra, choir and ballet. Some time later an idea to create a new ensemble was born and this one was called "Russian Souvenir". At this time it consisted of a big number of participants and many of them were not able to read musical notes that it why musicians tried to find a special language: they picked out some well-known music pieces and combined them with folk melodies. Then the first line-up of Terem Quartet was formed: Andrey Konstantinov, Andrey Smirnov, Mikhail Dzudze and Igor Ponomarenko.

At this time we promised each other that just the ensemble will be the main thing for all of us. We have already understood that we are interesting only when we are together. Our "Terem" is not just a beautiful building. There are no chiefs for us, everyone does his bit and it forms what we are building. In our music we unite different genres under one roof. Terem is open for guests, we are always glad to see them (Andrey Konstantinov)

The first concert took place on 26 November 1986 on the stage of music teachers training college. According to Andrey Konstantinov, at the end of the performance the audience stood up and musicians understood that their choice was right.  Since that time, November 26 is considered to be the birthday of the ensemble.

In 1988 Terem Quartet was invited to take part in "White Nights" festival in Hamburg. Here musicians performed with Mariinsky Theatre soloist Vladimir Chernov, ballerina Lubov Kunakova and pianist Pavel Egorov. Also in that year director Igor Vladimirov proposed to write music for performance "Love till Death" (Lubov do Groba).

In 1989 Melodiya released the first LP record of the ensemble - "Terem Quartet". At this time Terem Quartet began to cooperate with St. Petersburg State Academic Capella. Besides the ensemble began to give performances abroad: in Germany, Spain, Sweden, Italy and People's Republic of China. This year musicians received diplomas of higher education in music.

1990s 

In 1991 Terem Quartet was invited to take part in Womad. Within the bounds of this event musicians performed on one stage with Peter Gabriel, Sinéad O'Connor, Suzanne Vega and Led Zeppelin. At Peter Gabriel's instance Real World Records recorded the first CD of the ensemble - "The Terem". This Cd was released in 1992. Allmusic Guide gives 4.5 stars to it: "The Quartet's eccentric approach transforms everything it touches into shades of humor and delight". In the next years Terem Quartet repeatedly performed on Womad.

In 1994 Pope John Paul II invited Terem-Quartet to Vatican. Here at the "Family Day" holiday they gave concert to 120-thousand audience. Among the listeners was Mother Teresa who blessed the musicians and presented them medallions. This year two cds were released: "Classical" and "1000 concert" (1000-й концерт). The first one was released by "Real World Records" and received its name after Mozart's, Schubert's, Glinka's and Chopin's pieces in it. The second is a recording of the 1000 concert in Saint Petersburg Philharmonia and it was released on Terem-Quartet label.

In 1998 Terem-Quartet performed on Edinburgh festival and solo concerts of the ensemble received the highest mark of "Scotsman" newspaper.  This year Terem-Quartet took part in performance of Anton Chekhov's work and this one was awarded the highest theatrical prize "Golden Soffit" (Zolotoy Sophit).

In 1999 within the bounds of Alexander Pushkin 300-anniversary celebration Terem Quartet played Alexander Chaikovsky's opera in St. James's Palace. Among the listeners was Prince Charles. This year two Cds were released: «No, Russia cannot be perceived by wit» ("Intuition" Label) produced by Giovanni Amighetti is awarded 4 stars by Allmusic: "These classically-trained musicians exhibit masterful technique at their tools. The sounds they make seem to arise from an ensemble much greater than a quartet. Subtle, inventive, and gifted with a sense of humor, their gypsy turns thrill and enthrall". The second - "Flea Waltz" (Sobachy Vals) was released by Bomba-Piter and mostly consists of classical compositions adapted by the ensemble.

2000–2010 

In 2000, the line-up underwent changes: Igor Ponomarenko was replaced by Alexey Barshchev. That year, National Geographic Society shot a film about Terem Quartet.

In 2001, the ensemble celebrated its 15th anniversary. For the occasion, a great Russia tour (50 concerts) and release of Jubillenium CD were organized.

In 2002, Bomba-Piter released a three-CD compilation: Anthology I, "Anthology II" and "Anthology III". Besides the Russian Sufferings album was released.

In 2003, Terem Quartet organized its own world music festival in St. Petersburg. It comprised five concerts: Dora Shwarzberg (Austria), Sexteto Canyengue (Netherlands), Boris Berezovsky, Martin Frost (Sweden) and Ural Philharmonic Orchestra conducted by Dmitry Liss. The next year, the second festival was set up. That one comprised four concerts: Vladimir Chernov, Sexteto Canyengue, The Real Group (Sweden), Richard Galliano and Michelle Portal (France). The third festival took place in 2005 and comprised three concerts among which, one was of Swingle Singers.

In 2004 three CDs were released: Terem Quartet and Friends (featuring Remake ensemble, Vladimir Chernov, Joji Hirota, Svetlana Kruchkova, Dora Shwarzberg, Igor Sharapov, Arkady Shilkloper and Igor Dmitriev), "2000-th concert" (recording of the concert in Saint Petersburg Philharmonia on 25 March 2004) and "Neapolitan Songs" (joint project with Vladimir Chernov).

In 2006 Terem Quartet was invited to take part in several political events: Russia-Singapore Forum in Singapore and G8 summit in Saint Petersburg. On 28 June Terem Quartet for the first time performed with ballet and, in the period 24–27 November, the fourth world music festival was organized. During its long life, the ensemble traveled a lot and in October 2007 the concert in the 60th country (South Korea) was performed.

On 5 April 2008 Terem Quartet organized a forum in which musicians all over the world represented their native countries: Great Britain (Swingle Singers), France (Bratch), Scotland (Shooglenifty), Sweden (Real Group), Iceland (Diddú), Japan (Joji Hirota) and Russia (Yuri Shevchuk, Igor Butman and Pelageya Khanova). Also this year the «Diddu og Terem» was released. All vocal parts were recorded by Diddú.

In 2009, Terem Quartet opened the Eurovision second semi-final in Moscow. For this event, musicians prepared 6-minute potpourri of songs-winners of this competition ("Waterloo" by ABBA, "Volare", "Diva" by Dana International, "Believe" by Dima Bilan and Ding-A-Dong by Teach-In). This year the DVD "Terem Quartet or Imperceptibles" (Terem-Quartet Y Snova Neulovimiye) was released. It comprises compositions from popular Soviet movies, Charlie Chaplin's ones and Mission: Impossible Theme.

In 2010, with the assistance of Saint Petersburg government and Ministry of Culture, Terem Quartet organized First TEREM CROSSOVER International Music Competition in St. Petersburg.

Style 
In 1991 Peter Gabriel called the ensemble style "Teremism" by analogy with "communism". In European terminology Terem-Quartet's style is known as "World music".

In the "Creative Infantry" (Tvorchesky Desant) programme the musicians themselves spoke about their style: the instruments they play give wit to any genre that is why the ensemble turned to classical music, to jazz and to folk-rock but the basis lies in Russian culture, national customs and Russian original world-view. Meanwhile, Andrey Konstantinov added that they take all the best from both western and eastern cultures.

The name of the ensemble resembles this attitude: "Terem" is a big house which unites musical currents all over the world.

Terem is not only a house. It is a place where everything is fine. When creating the ensemble if we had set our goal to make money we wouldn't have become Terem. We always have had a sublime goal - to create contemporary music on the basis of national one so that it was clear and public. So that it excited us and the audience (Andrey Konstantinov).

Sometimes musicians called their style "Terem" but then the appropriate word was found - "crossover". Andrey Konstantinov explained that this genre implies the combination of different styles in order to express music content in a more interesting way.

Terem Quartet was invited to various festivals, it participated in jazz, classical, rock and even punk ones.

Critics 

The Quartet's immaculate musicianship shines like an illuminated manuscript...(Independent)

Mozart, Chopin and Bizet as you've never heard them before - classical music become theatre. (The Scotsman)

Love, hatred, irony, more philosophical feelings, all of these are mixed in Russian music, it's very spiritual. (Independent)

Nikita Mikhalkov said that it was important for him to find a wonderful combination of professionalism, musicality, mischief and root structure in the ensemble.

Yuri Shevchuk after the joint performance with the ensemble said that his band DDT and Terem Quartet will be friends. For 20-anniversary he presented the notes of his songs in a hope that Terem Quartet sometime will perform one of them. Terem Quartet took part in recording of 3 songs form DDT's "Beautiful Love" (Prekrasnaya Lubov) album.

Members 

Current line-up includes 4 members:
Andrey Konstantinov (Soprano domra)
Andrey Smirnov (Bayan accordion)
Vladimir Kudryavtcev (Double bass)
Alexey Barshev (Alto domra)

Releases

LP

Compact Cassettes

CD

DVD

Other activity 

Since 2003 Terem-Quartet organizes world music festivals in Saint Petersburg. In 2010 the ensemble set up "Terem Crossover First International Music Competition" which took place from 22 to 28 March. 71 ensembles participated and the jury was formed from famous people: Terem-Quartet musicians, founder of "Real World Records" Thomas Brooman, saxophonist Igor Butman, clarnettist Giora Feidman, accordionist Yasuhiro Kobayashi, pianist Andrey Kondakov, composer Hughes de Courson, Leszek Lukas Barwinski (Universal Music), composer Dmitri Yanov-Yanovsky and Yorrick Benoist (Run Production). During the competition workshops and concerts of the jury were held. Award ceremony and gala-concert took place on 28 March in Saint Petersburg Philharmonia.

Terem-Quartet participates in charities, giving concerts for benefit of cultural funds which are in charge of Russian art revival.

Terem-Quartet organizes competition for gifted children "TeremOK". In 2007 about 1000 children participated in it. After that "TeremOK" album with songs in Russian and German was released. The winners were lucky to sing to the accompaniment of Terem-Quartet during the concert in Saint Petersburg State Academic Capella.

In 2010 Terem-Quartet took part in Long Night of Museums. The excursions showing musician's costumes, rarity photos, posters, awards, prizes and presents were held in ensemble art-center. One of this excursions was held by Andrey Konstantinov.

Terem-Quartet regularly records ensembles in its own studio in Saint Petersburg.

References

External links
 

 

 

 

 

 

Musical groups established in 1986
Chamber music groups
Russian musical groups
Real World Records artists
1986 establishments in the Soviet Union